The Wee Thump Joshua Tree Wilderness is a designated (2002) wilderness area in Nevada. It comprises  and has an expanse of old-growth Joshua trees. "Wee Thump" means "ancient ones" in the language of the Paiute people.  This Bureau of Land Management wilderness is a few miles west of Searchlight, Nevada.

References

External links
Wee Thump Joshua Tree Wilderness Fact Sheet - BLM 
Wee Thump Joshua Tree Wilderness - Wilderness Connect
Wee Thump Joshua Tree Wilderness - Friends of Nevada Wilderness

Wilderness areas of Nevada
Protected areas of Clark County, Nevada